General José Carlos de Nardi, is the former Chief of the Joint Staff of the Armed Forces of Brazil. De Nardi was sworn in as the first Chief of the Joint Staff of the Armed Forces by then-Defense Minister Nelson Jobim on 6 September 2010. On 8 December 2015, Admiral Ademir Sobrinho was sworn in as the second Chief of the Joint Staff by Defense Minister Aldo Rebelo.

References

1944 births
Living people
Brazilian generals
20th-century Brazilian military personnel
21st-century Brazilian military personnel